George Fenwick or Fenwicke may refer to:

Sir George Fenwick (1847–1929), New Zealand newspaper proprietor and editor
George Fenwick (Parliamentarian) (1603–1657), founder of Saybrook Colony in Connecticut
George Fenwicke (1690–1760), English clergyman and religious writer